Guaico is a community on the northeast of Trinidad island, in the Republic of Trinidad and Tobago.

It is located west of Sangre Grande,  and is administered by the Sangre Grande Regional Corporation.

Gallery

References

Populated places in Trinidad and Tobago
Trinidad (island)